ETS translocation variant 1 is a protein that in humans is encoded by the ETV1 gene.

References

Further reading

External links 
 

Transcription factors